Western Heritage is a 1948 American Western film directed by Wallace Grissell. The film is a Tim Holt B Western about land robbers and forgers in the southwest.

Although based on an original screenplay the film features Chito Rafferty from RKO's earlier Zane Grey series.

Cast 
 Tim Holt as Ross Daggert
 Richard Martin as Chito Rafferty
 Nan Leslie as Beth Winston
 Lois Andrews as Cleo Raymond
 Tony Barrett as Henchman Trigg McCord
 Walter Reed as Joe Powell, forger
 Harry Woods as Arnold, fake Joe Powell
 Tom Keene as Saloon owner Spade Thorne
 Jason Robards, Sr. as Judge Henry C. Winston
 Robert Bray as Henchman Pike
 Perc Launders as Sheriff Claibourne

Reception
The film recorded a loss of $5,000.

References

External links 

1948 films
1948 Western (genre) films
American Western (genre) films
American black-and-white films
Films shot in Lone Pine, California
RKO Pictures films
Films scored by Paul Sawtell
Films directed by Wallace Grissell
1940s English-language films
1940s American films